IP packet may refer to:
Internet Protocol
IPv4 packet
IPv6 packet